Wrath Records is a British small independent record label founded in 2002 and based in Leeds, Yorkshire, England. Unlike some 'indie labels', Wrath does not feature backing from any major record companies.

Originally set up by Steven and Paul Morricone of The Scaramanga Six to produce and market their own records, the label has expanded to release material by the following artists:

 Beachbuggy
 Being 747
 The Bilderberg Group
 Champion Kickboxer 
 Chris T-T
 Chuck
 Engerica
 Eureka Machines
 Farming Incident
 Galitza
 Instant Species
 The Interiors
 Landspeed Loungers
 Les Flames
 Little Japanese Toy
 The Lodger
 Magoo
 Mama Scuba 
 Me Against Them
 Piskie Sits
 The Playmates
 Sarandon
 The Scaramanga Six
 The Secret Hairdresser
 Stuffy/The Fuses
 The Terminals
 YSN

Wrath Records release material on CD albums and singles, and also ran the Supersevens Singles Club (a subscriber-only series of vinyl seven-inch singles, each of which were split between two different artists).

The label is associated with Poison Pen Films, Paul Morricone's film production company.

References

External links
 Wrath Records homepage
 Interview with Steven Morricone about Wrath Records

British independent record labels
Record labels established in 2001
Alternative rock record labels